Nova Scotia's rivers all flow into the Atlantic Ocean through four unique watersheds: the Gulf of Maine, the Northumberland Strait, the Gulf of Saint Lawrence and into the Atlantic Ocean itself.

Gulf of Maine

The Gulf of Maine system includes the Bay of Fundy, which includes the Cumberland and Minas Basins. In Nova Scotia, the system occupies the shores from Fort Lawrence to Cape St. Mary (44°05′N).

Bay of Fundy

The Bay of Fundy coastline in Nova Scotia begins at Fort Lawrence and circles Cape Chignecto eastward to Truro. It then follows west along the Annapolis Valley as far as Brier Island on the Digby Neck. Within the Bay of Fundy are two basins: Chignecto Bay which begins at Fort Lawrence and ends at Cape Chignecto, and the Minas Basin that encompasses everything east of Ramshead Point (near Diligent River) and Cape Split.

Apple River (Note: westernmost river on the north coast of the Bay of Fundy)
Fox River
Ramshead River 
Diligent River (Note: easternmost river on the north coast of Bay of Fundy)
Annapolis River (Note: easternmost river on the south coast of Bay of Fundy)
Nictaux River
Moose River
Bear River 
Little River

Minas Basin

The Minas Basin flows into the Bay of Fundy between Ramshead Point and Cape Split.

Habitant River
Gaspereau River
Black River
Avon River
 Halfway River (Kings County)
Cogmagun River
River Hebert
 Halfway River (Cumberland County)
Kennetcook River
St. Croix River
Walton River
Tennycape River
Noel River
East Noel River
Shubenacadie River
Stewiacke River
Five Mile River
Nine Mile River
St. Andrews River
Gays River
Salmon River
North River
Chiganois River
Debert River
Folly River
Great Village River
Portapique River
Bass River
West Bass River
Little Bass River
Economy River
East River
North River
Harrington River
Moose River
Farrells River

Gulf of Maine

The Gulf of Maine coastline in Nova Scotia begins at Brier Island and continues to Cape St. Mary.

Sissiboo River
Rivière Grosses Coques
Belliveau River
Meteghan River
Salmon River
Indian River
Chebogue River
Little River
Tusket River
Abrams River

Atlantic Ocean

The Atlantic Ocean coastline in Nova Scotia begins at Cape Sable Island and continues to Cape Canso. The list is divided into the geographical shorelines in the province.

South Shore

The South Shore extends from Cape Sable Island to Halifax Harbour.

Barrington River
 Clyde River
Round Bay River
Roseway River
Jordan River
Sable River
Broad River
Five Rivers
Mersey River
Shelburne River
Medway River
Petite Rivière
LaHave River
Mushamush River
Martins River
Vaughns River
Gold River
Middle River
East River
Little East River
Ingram River
Prospect River
Terence Bay River

Eastern Shore

The Eastern Shore extends from Halifax Harbour to the Strait of Canso.
Tillmann Brook
Sackville River
Little Sackville River
Little Salmon River
Chezzetcook River
Musquodoboit River
West River Sheet Harbour
East River Sheet Harbour
Salmon River
Quoddy River
Moser River
Ecum Secum River
Liscombe River
St. Mary's River
Indian River
Country Harbour River
Isaacs Harbour River
Costley River
Garry River
New Harbour River
Larrys River
Salmon River
Milford Haven River
Roman Valley River
Clam Harbour River
St. Francis Harbour River

Gulf of Saint Lawrence

The Gulf of Saint Lawrence coastline in Nova Scotia begins at Cape Canso and continues to Cape George Point.

Cape Breton Island
Aspy River
Ingonish River
North River
Sydney River
Mira River
Framboise River
Grand River
Graham River
Broad Cove River
Margaree River
Chéticamp River
Mackenzie River
Grand Anse River

Bras d'Or Lake

River Denys
Middle River
Baddeck River
Skye River
Georges River

St. George's Bay

Wrights River
Little Tracadie River
Tracadie River
Afton River
Pomquet River
Black Avon River
Alder River
South River
West River

Northumberland Strait 

The Northumberland Strait coastline in Nova Scotia begins at Cape George Point and continues to the Tidnish River.

Ohio River
James River
Rights River
North River
Barneys River
French River
Sutherlands River 
boat harbour (out fall)
East River of Pictou
Middle River of Pictou
West River of Pictou
Big Caribou River
Caribou River
Toney River
River John
Waughs River
Black River
French River
Dewar River
Wallace River
Pugwash River
River Philip
Little River
Goose River
Shinimicas River
Tidnish River

See also 
List of rivers of Canada

References

Nova Scotia

Rivers